A Escolinha do Golias (English: The Little School of Golias) was a Brazilian television program presented and produced by SBT between 1990 and 1997. Returned to be displayed by SBT in 2007, in the schedule of the El Chavo.

Cast the first season 
 Ronald Golias .... Pacífico 
 Carlos Alberto de Nóbrega ... Professor Caliostro 
 Nair Bello .... Pazza 
 Patrícia Opik ... Alemanha 
 Henrique de Moraes ... Mangaba

Cast the second season 
 Ronald Golias .... Pacífico 
 Carlos Alberto de Nóbrega ... Professor Caliostro 
 Consuelo Leandro ... Severina  
 Patrícia Opik ... Alemanha 
 Marta Pessoa ... Paçoca
 Henrique de Moraes ... Mangaba

Cast the third season 
 Ronald Golias .... Professor Bartolomeu Guimarães
 Otaviano Costa .... Aguinalberto Boa Pinta
 João Paulo Silvino  
 Paulo Silvino  
 Norton Nascimento

References

External links 
 A Escolinha do Golias – Curiosities at the Serie Total

Sistema Brasileiro de Televisão original programming
Brazilian television series
1990 Brazilian television series debuts
1997 Brazilian television series endings
1990s Brazilian television series
Portuguese-language television shows